The 1912–13 season was Newport County's first season in the Southern League.

Season review

League

Results summary
Note: Two points for a win

Fixtures and results

Southern League Second Division

Welsh Cup

League table

External links
 Newport County Archives

References

 Amber in the Blood: A History of Newport County. 

1912-13
English football clubs 1912–13 season
1912–13 in Welsh football